Steve Webb (born 1965) is a British politician.

Steve or Steven Webb may also refer to:
Steve Webb (medical physicist) (born 1948), British medical physicist and writer
Steve Webb (ice hockey) (born 1975), Canadian ice hockey player
Steven Webb (born 1984), British actor

See also
Stephen Webb (disambiguation)